Ramón Rafael Morel (born August 15, 1974) is a Dominican Republic former professional baseball pitcher.

External links

1974 births
Chicago Cubs players
Dominican Republic expatriate baseball players in Japan
Dominican Republic expatriate baseball players in Taiwan
Dominican Republic expatriate baseball players in the United States
Hanshin Tigers players

Living people
Major League Baseball players from the Dominican Republic
Nippon Professional Baseball pitchers
Pittsburgh Pirates players
Augusta GreenJackets players
Calgary Cannons players
Carolina Mudcats players
Dominican Republic expatriate baseball players in Canada
Gulf Coast Expos players
Gulf Coast Pirates players
La New Bears players
Leones del Escogido players
Lynchburg Hillcats players
Ottawa Lynx players
Sinon Bulls players
Welland Pirates players